Mike Minor may refer to:

Mike Minor (actor) (1940–2016), American actor
Mike Minor (baseball) (born 1987), American baseball pitcher
Mike Minor (snowboarder) (born 1990), Paralympic gold medalist

See also
Michael Minor (1941–1987), illustrator and Star Trek director